Alsophila crinita, synonym Cyathea crinita, is a species of tree fern native to India and Sri Lanka. It is considered to be endangered.

Distribution and habitat
Alsophila crinita is found between 1,500 and 2,200 m in the Western Ghats of India and in the central wet zone of Sri Lanka, in about 15 locations. Few individual plants are found together, along streams and in marshy areas.

Conservation
The species is considered to be endangered; threats include road construction and use of the entire plant for ornamental purposes. An in-vitro protocol for propagation has been developed, and ex-situ populations established at two locations.

References

crinita
Flora of India (region)
Flora of Sri Lanka
Ferns of Asia
Plants described in 1844